The 1982 World Doubles was the first championship of a  tournament for professional snooker players. The championship was sponsored by brewers Hofmeister and 29 teams entered the event with the last 16 competing at the National Recreation Centre in Crystal Palace, London. It was played in December with the semi-finals and final televised on ITV between 15 and 19 December 1982.

The venue was not popular, and the match that featured Terry Griffiths and Doug Mountjoy against Kirk Stevens and Jim Wych only had 67 spectators during the first session. Steve Davis and Tony Meo went on to win the tournament beating Griffiths and Mountjoy 13–2 in the final. Davis and Meo achieved a combined break of 193 in their semi-final with Tony Knowles and Jimmy White, which included a single 124 break by Meo. Davis became the first player to have won three types of world professional titles with the individual, team and doubles. Only Alex Higgins and Stephen Hendry became other players later on to reach that achievement.
 


Results
Winning players are denoted in bold.

Earlier Rounds
A pre-qualifying round and qualifying round took place leading up to the first round. Winning players are denoted in bold. Played between 1–3 November 1982.

Pre-qualifying

References

World Doubles Championship
World Doubles Championship
World Doubles Championship
World Doubles Championship